Bernard Whitman is a Democratic Party political pollster and strategist in the United States.  He makes regular appearances on Fox News, and has appeared as a commentator and strategist on CNN, MSNBC, CNBC, Fox Business, ABC and Al Jazeera America.

He is the author of 52 Reasons To Vote For Obama and has been a pollster to political candidates such as Bill Clinton and Michael Bloomberg, as well as international clients.  Bernard has been involved in the past eight U.S. presidential campaigns and has served as strategic advisor to numerous heads of state, Fortune 500 CEOs, and some of the world's leading issue advocacy organizations and nonprofit institutions.

Bernard's commentary and opinions on current political topics have been covered by national media outlets, and he regularly appears on Fox News to debate conservative commentators.  He is a strong supporter of marriage equality and has written opinion columns and appeared on major news networks to advocate his position.

Whitman is the President and founder of Whitman Insight Strategies, a strategic consulting firm that conducts polls and market research to advise corporations, political leaders, and issue-advocacy organizations.  He is a three-time recipient of the David Ogilvy Excellence in Research Award, and pioneered the development of The Political Model to identify the “swing” consumer, and the messages and media channels that can unlock additional votes for a brand or cause.

He is an alumnus of Brown University, and served as a Peace Corps Volunteer in Senegal, West Africa.

References

External links
 Bernard Whitman discusses the situation in Iraq with Gretchen Carlson and Tony Sayegh on The Real Story
 Leon Charney interviews Bernard Whitman on Leon Charney Reports

American political consultants
American Jews
LGBT Jews
Living people
Pollsters
Year of birth missing (living people)